Shansirhinus is an extinct genus of rhinoceros endemic to China during the Miocene through Pliocene.

Members of Shansirhinus were originally classified as species of Chilotherium.

References

Miocene rhinoceroses
Miocene mammals of Asia
Pliocene mammals of Asia
Pliocene rhinoceroses
Fossil taxa described in 1942